Chautauqua County (county code CQ) is a county located in Southeast Kansas, United States.  As of the 2020 census, the county population was 3,379. Its county seat and most populous city is Sedan.  Chautauqua County is named for Chautauqua County, New York, the birthplace of Edward Jaquins, a Kansas politician who was instrumental in getting the county established.

History

Early history

For many millennia, the Great Plains of North America was inhabited by nomadic Native Americans. The name is non-native, but is derived from the now-extinct Native Erie language, spoken near the Great Lakes. From the 16th century to 18th century, the Kingdom of France claimed ownership of large parts of North America.  In 1762, after the French and Indian War, France secretly ceded New France to Spain, per the Treaty of Fontainebleau.

19th century
In 1802, Spain returned most of the land to France, but keeping title to about 7,500 square miles.  In 1803, most of the land for modern day Kansas was acquired by the United States from France as part of the 828,000 square mile Louisiana Purchase for 2.83 cents per acre.

In 1854, the Kansas Territory was organized, then in 1861 Kansas became the 34th U.S. state.  Chautauqua County was created by an act of the Kansas legislature on June 1, 1875, by the division of Howard County into Elk County (the northern half) and Chautauqua County (the southern half). At the time of its creation, the county's population was about 7,400.

Geography

Adjacent counties
 Elk County (north)
 Montgomery County (east)
 Washington County, Oklahoma (southeast)
 Osage County, Oklahoma (south)
 Cowley County (west)

Major highways
Sources:  National Atlas, U.S. Census Bureau
 U.S. Route 166
 Kansas Highway 38
 Kansas Highway 99

Demographics

As of the 2000 census, there were 4,359 people, 1,796 households, and 1,235 families residing in the county.  The population density was 7 people per square mile (3/km2).  There were 2,169 housing units at an average density of 3 per square mile (1/km2).  The racial makeup of the county was 93.83% White, 0.30% Black or African American, 3.58% Native American, 0.07% Asian, 0.05% Pacific Islander, 0.34% from other races, and 1.84% from two or more races. Hispanic or Latino of any race were 1.35% of the population.

There were 1,796 households, out of which 26.20% had children under the age of 18 living with them, 57.30% were married couples living together, 7.90% had a female householder with no husband present, and 31.20% were non-families. 29.40% of all households were made up of individuals, and 16.40% had someone living alone who was 65 years of age or older.  The average household size was 2.34 and the average family size was 2.87.

In the county, the population was spread out, with 23.40% under the age of 18, 6.10% from 18 to 24, 20.90% from 25 to 44, 25.20% from 45 to 64, and 24.30% who were 65 years of age or older.  The median age was 45 years. For every 100 females there were 93.60 males.  For every 100 females age 18 and over, there were 91.20 males.

The median income for a household in the county was $28,717, and the median income for a family was $33,871. Males had a median income of $25,083 versus $21,346 for females. The per capita income for the county was $16,280.  About 9.00% of families and 12.20% of the population were below the poverty line, including 15.80% of those under age 18 and 10.60% of those age 65 or over.

Government

Presidential elections

Chautauqua is an overwhelmingly Republican county. The only Republican to ever lose the county has been Herbert Hoover during his landslide 1932 election defeat when he carried fewer than fifty counties west of the Mississippi. Apart from never-Democratic, historically Yankee Doniphan County, it was the only Kansas county to give incumbent President William Howard Taft a plurality in 1912. The last Democrat to pass thirty percent of the county's vote was Michael Dukakis in 1988, and in 2020 Joe Biden received merely less than thirteen percent.

Laws
Although the Kansas Constitution was amended in 1986 to allow the sale of alcoholic liquor by the individual drink with the approval of voters, Chautauqua County remained a prohibition, or "dry", county, until 2008, when a county wide ballot measure was approved to allow individual liquor sales with a 30 percent food requirement.

Education

Unified school districts
 Cedar Vale USD 285
 Sedan USD 286

Communities

Cities
 Cedar Vale
 Chautauqua
 Elgin
 Niotaze
 Peru
 Sedan

Unincorporated communities

 Cloverdale
 Grafton
 Hale
 Hewins
 Jonesburg (originally spelled Jonesburgh)
 Lowe (Gibbs)
 Monett
 Rogers
 Wauneta

Ghost towns

 Boston
 Layton
 Leeds
 Matanzas
 Moore
 Osro

Townships
Chautauqua County is divided into twelve townships.  None of the cities within the county are considered governmentally independent, and all figures for the townships include those of the cities.  In the following table, the population center is the largest city (or cities) included in that township's population total, if it is of a significant size.

See also

References

Further reading

 Handbook of Elk and Chautauqua Counties, Kansas; C.S. Burch Publishing Co; 24 pages; 1886.
 Standard Atlas of Chautauqua County, Kansas; Geo. A. Ogle & Co; 66 pages; 1921.
 Standard Atlas of Chautauqua County, Kansas; Geo. A. Ogle & Co; 32 pages; 1903.

External links

County
 
 Chautauqua County - Directory of Public Officials
Maps
 Chautauqua County Maps: Current, Historic, KDOT
 Kansas Highway Maps: Current, Historic, KDOT
 Kansas Railroad Maps: Current, 1996, 1915, KDOT and Kansas Historical Society

 
Kansas counties
Kansas placenames of Native American origin
1875 establishments in Kansas
Populated places established in 1875